Dhatala is a small village between Shyampur and Rampur. It is 1 km away from the village Shyampur.
It is under Saltora police station.

Schools
There is a primary school in the village named 
Dhatla Primary School

Demographics
According to 2011 Census of India 
Total population =2,302 
Males= (51%)
Females= (49%)
Population below= 6 years was 300 .

Nearest villages
Telidihi (attached)
Shyampur (1 km)
Rampur (1.5 km)
Saltora (7 km)
Pathdoha (3 km)
Kanuri (4 km)

See also
Bankura District

References

Villages in Bankura district